BFL Group is an international discount retailer founded in 1996 by Toufic Kreidieh. It is based in the United Arab Emirates. BFL Group has dozens of stores in major cities across Europe and the Middle East.

History
The BFL Group was founded by Toufic Kreidieh and Yasser Beydoun in 1996. The headquarters were estalibhsed in Dubai in 2000, and its first store was launched in 2006.

Its headquarters are located in Techno Park, Dubai, UAE. It has locations across the UAE, including in Abu Dhabi, as well as in neighboring countries such as Oman.

BFL, which stands for "Brands for Less," has expanded its business with more than 74 stores spread over 6 countries in the Middle East and Europe (including Spain and Malta). It has expanded with brands such as Homes For Less, Toys For Less, Mumuso, and Tchibo.

BFL Group's stores are variety stores that carry many different types of items, including clothing, sportswear, toys, kitchen products, and others.

See also
Dollar Tree
Dollar store

References

Companies based in Dubai
Retail companies established in 1996
Variety stores